Shams ol-Moluk Mosahab (1913–1997) was an Iranian educator and politician. In 1963 she was one of the first two women appointed to the Senate.

Biography
Mosahab was born in Tehran in 1913, the third child of the politician Mohammed Ali Mosahab. Her brother Gholamhossein later became a mathematician. She attended Namus primary school and then the Higher Teacher Training College. She then became one of the first group of women to be admitted to the University of Tehran, becoming the first woman to earn a PhD in the subject in 1945. She subsequently attended Laval University in Canada and the University of Florida and University of Indiana in the United States, studying for a second doctorate.

After returning to Iran, she began lecturing at the University of Tehran, subsequently becoming a headteacher at the Parvin, Shahdokht, and Nurbaksh girls high schools, as well as serving as director of the Higher Education and Teacher Training department in the Ministry of Education. She later worked for the Ministry of Culture and became Deputy Minister of Education.

Mosahab also campaigned for women's suffrage. Women were granted the right to vote in 1963, and following the parliamentary elections that year, Mosahab was one of two women appointed to the Senate. She remained in the Senate until 1980.

She died in 1997.

References

1913 births
University of Tehran alumni
Université Laval alumni
University of Florida alumni
Indiana University alumni
Academic staff of the University of Tehran
Iranian educators
Iranian civil servants
Suffragists
20th-century Iranian women politicians
20th-century Iranian politicians
Members of the Senate of Iran
1997 deaths